= Miracle Flights =

American nonprofit

- Formation: 1985
- Type: 501(c)(3) nonprofit organization
- Headquarters: Las Vegas, Nevada, U.S.
- Region served: United States
- Key people: Leslie Baron-Mosley (CEO)
- Website: https://miracleflights.org

Miracle Flights is a United States-based 501(c)(3) nonprofit is a nonprofit organization based in Las Vegas, Nevada that provides free commercial air travel for children needing specialized medical care unavailable in their local communities. Founded in 1985, the organization coordinates flights for pediatric patients and their families throughout the United States.

== History ==
Miracle Flights was founded in 1985 to assist patients traveling for medical care. Over time, the nonprofit expanded its services nationwide through partnerships with healthcare providers, airlines, and corporate sponsors.

In 2024, Miracle Flights announced it had surpassed 100 million miles flown for patients and caregivers traveling to treatment appointments.

== Programs ==
=== Medical flight program ===
The organization's primary program provides free commercial flights for pediatric patients ages 17 and under must travel for specialized medical care. Flights are coordinated through commercial airline partners and are available to qualifying families based on medical and financial eligibility requirements.

== Funding and operations ==
Miracle Flights is supported through donations, corporate partnerships, grants, and fundraising events. The company has held public events.

== Impact ==
As of March 2026, the nonprofit has coordinated 167,000 flights.
